Receptor protein serine/threonine kinases are enzyme-linked receptors that belong to protein-serine/threonine kinases. The systematic name of this enzyme class is ATP:[receptor-protein] phosphotransferase. Proteins from this group participate in 7 metabolic pathways: MAPK signaling pathway, cytokine-cytokine receptor interaction, TGF beta signaling pathway, adherens junction, colorectal cancer, pancreatic cancer, and chronic myeloid leukemia.

Links
Receptor protein serine/threonine kinases in IUPHAR Guide to Pharmacology

References

 
 
 

EC 2.7.11
Enzymes of known structure
Single-pass transmembrane proteins